The Monroes is a primetime soap opera starring William Devane and Susan Sullivan, that ran from September 12, 1995 to October 19, 1995 on ABC. The Monroes capitalizes on the rise of high drama in politics.

Cast
 William Devane as John Monroe, a powerful and wealthy power broker who is running for governor of Maryland
 Susan Sullivan as Kathryn Monroe, the smart and long-suffering matriarch
 David Andrews as Congressman William “Billy” Monroe, the eldest son who is politically ambitious but keeps stumbling into extramarital affairs
 Lynn Clark as Anne Monroe, Billy’s suffering wife
 Cecil Hoffman as Greer Monroe, a cold-blooded and intelligent attorney who is having an affair with a Washington, D.C. figure who, for the time being, is not revealed but who may just turn out to be the President of the United States
 Steven Eckholdt as James Monroe, John's favorite son, a former astronaut, despises politics and his father's plays
 Tracy Griffith as Ruby Monroe, a photographer and newlywed already on the brink of ending her marriage
 Darryl Theirse as Michael Bradley
 Tristan Tait as Gabriel Monroe

Reception
From the start, the show faced stiff competition against Seinfeld and was not expected to fare well. In Variety, Brian Lowry wrote:[The] show’s chances appear contingent on patience and modest expectations. Even so, look for this serialized drama about a high-powered political family to have a tough time winning a second term.

In Entertainment Weekly, critic Ken Tucker wrote:John’s wife, Kathryn, played with icy devilishness by Susan Sullivan, is both smart and long-suffering. And, of course, it doesn’t take long for a mistress of John’s to pop up and utter the line ”Your husband has an enormous appetite for conquest of all kinds.” Most of The Monroes is as stiff as that snippet of dialogue, but Devane and Sullivan have obvious fun as would-be power brokers, and anyone who wishes Dynasty were still on may find this potboiler amusing.

Episodes

References

External links
 
 

1995 American television series debuts
1995 American television series endings
American television soap operas
American primetime television soap operas
Television series by Warner Bros. Television Studios
American Broadcasting Company original programming
English-language television shows
Television shows set in Washington, D.C.